Kraina  is the eighth studio album by Ukrainian singer Iryna Bilyk released on 10 June 2003 by JRC and Mamamusic. This is the last Ukrainian-language album by Biylk to date.

Overview
Work on the album began in 2001. Two albums were recorded in parallel: Kraina and its Polish version Biłyk. Most of the songs on the album were written by Bilyk herself. The song "Do pochatku" was performed by Bilyk at a new year's concert in 1999. The only non-Ukrainian-language song on the album is "Obcy ty", which was written in Polish by Michał Kuźmiński and also included on previous album Biłyk (2002). The song "Movchaty" recorded with the band Skryabin. Lyrics for the song "Banduriste, orle syzii..." was taken from poem "K. Markevichu" (1840) by Ukrainian writer Taras Shevchenko. The album is divided into two equal parts: Dusha (Soul) and Sertse (Heart).

The album was released on 10 June 2003 in Ukraine.

In 2001 the music video for the song "Kraina" (directed by Alan Badoev) was shot, but it was later remounted and released in 2003 as a music video for the song "A meni b tudy". In total seven more music videos were made to support the album: "Ne plach, Marichko" (2002, directed by Mxim Papernik), "Doroga" (2002, directed by Viktor Priduvalov), "Kraina" (2002, directed by Papernik), "Ty anhel" (2002, directed by Papernik), "Tvoi ruky" (2003, directed by Papernik) and "Movchaty" (2003, directed by Priduvalov). Music video for "Banduriste, orle syzii" was directed by Badoev in 2004 but was released only in 2012. 

A concert tour of Ukraine was held in support of the album. The concerts were sold out.

In 2008 the album was re-released by Moon Records in honor of the 20th anniversary of Iryna Bilyk's creative activity.

In 2020 the song "Movchaty" was included in the list "20 iconic songs for 20 years" of the Ukrainian music award YUNA.

Track listing

Personnel
 Iryna Bilyk – lead vocals (all tracks), songwriting (1–6, 8–12, 13)
 Dmytro Klimashenko – lead vocals (5)
 Skryabin – lead vocals (7)
 Serhii Dotsenko – keyboards (1–7, 10, 12, 13), guitar (1–6, 10, 12, 13), percussion (2), background vocals (2-4, 10, 12, 13), arrangement (1–7, 10, 12, 13), programming (1–7, 10, 12, 13), recording (5)
 Zhan Bolotov – keyboards (8, 9, 11, 14), recording (8, 9, 11), mixing (8, 9, 11), arrangement (8, 9, 11, 14), programming (8, 9, 11, 14)
 Oleh Barabash – recording (8), mixing (8)
 Serhii Dobrovolskii – guitar (1–4, 6–10, 12–14), recording (all tracks), mixing (all tracks)
 Oleksii Zvolinskii – guitar (7)
 Eduard Kosse – bayan (6, 8, 9)
 Oles Zhuravchak – flute (3, 8, 9), tsymbaly (9), Jew's harp (9), ocarina (9)
 Vitalii Savenko – bass guitar (13)
 Myroslav Nazarchuk – tsymbaly (9)
 Volodymyr Kopot – trumpet (8, 11)
 Serhii Klymchenko – tuba (11)
 Nina Myrvoda – background vocals (9)
 Natalia Rebrik – background vocals (9)
 Ukrainian fan club – background vocals (10)

References

2003 albums
Iryna Bilyk albums
Mamamusic albums
Ukrainian-language albums
Polish-language albums